Graham Mark Benstead (born 20 August 1963) is an English retired professional footballer who made over 110 appearances as a goalkeeper in the Football League for Brentford. He also played League football for Sheffield United, Colchester United, Norwich City and was capped by England at youth and semi-pro level. Benstead is goalkeeping coach at Frimley Green.

Club career

Queens Park Rangers and Norwich City (1981–1988) 
Born in Aldershot, Hampshire, Benstead began his career as a part-time player at Wimbledon and then entered the youth system at Queens Park Rangers. He signed his first professional contract in 1981. He had to wait until 8 January 1983 to make what would be his only appearance for the club, which came with a start in a 3–2 FA Cup third round defeat to West Bromwich Albion. After a loan spell with Norwich City late in the 1984–85 season, Benstead joined the newly relegated Second Division club at the end of the campaign for an initial £10,000 fee, with up to £35,000 in add-ons.

After promotion straight back to the First Division in 1985–86 and in the face of competition from new £100,000 signing Bryan Gunn, Benstead began the 1986–87 season as Norwich City's first-choice goalkeeper, but a shoulder injury suffered in November 1986 effectively ended his Carrow Road career. After loan spells with Colchester United and Sheffield United, he joined the latter club on a permanent contract for a £35,000 fee in 1988.

Sheffield United and Brentford (1988–1993) 
Benstead was a regular for Sheffield United during the 1988–89 season, at the end of which the club celebrated promotion to the Second Division after a second-place finish. He lost his place to Simon Tracey during the 1989–90 season and made just one further appearance for the club before moving to Third Division Brentford in July 1990 for a £60,000 fee, with a further £10,000 to be paid after 25 appearances. Benstead had a successful first season with Brentford, missing just one match, keeping 23 clean sheets and winning the club's Supporters' and Players' Player of the Year awards. Despite suffering from hamstring and knee injuries, things were even better during the 1991–92 season, when the Bees finished the campaign as champions of the Third Division.

Despite missing four months of the 1992–93 First Division season with knee ligament damage and a hamstring injury, Benstead made 32 appearances during the campaign, which ended with relegation straight back to the Second Division. Benstead rejected the new contract offered to him during the 1993 off-season and was made available for loan. He failed to see eye-to-eye with new manager David Webb and made just seven early-1993–94 season appearances before joining Conference high-flyers Kettering Town on loan in October 1993. The deal was made permanent in December 1993, with Benstead signing on a free transfer. Benstead made 144 appearances during just over three seasons at Griffin Park.

Non-League football and return to Brentford (1993–1997) 
Benstead's 18 months with Conference club Kettering ended with second and sixth-place finishes respectively and he dropped down to the Southern League Premier Division to move to Northamptonshire rivals Rushden & Diamonds in June 1995. He had an excellent 1995–96 season, helping the club to the Premier Division title and promotion to the Conference. Benstead made just seven appearances during the 1996–97 season and had a non-playing spell with Kingstonian, before making a surprise return to Brentford in July 1997, as player/goalkeeping coach on a week-to-week contract. Minor surgery required by first-choice goalkeeper Kevin Dearden meant that Benstead made his second debut for the club in a 3–1 defeat to York City on 11 October 1997. He made one further appearance in an FA Cup first round replay versus former club Colchester United on 25 November, before being released by new manager Micky Adams in January 1998.

Return to non-League football (1997–2004) 
Benstead joined Isthmian League Premier Division club Basingstoke Town in 1998 and wound down his career with spells at Chertsey Town, Farnborough Town and Stevenage Borough.

International career 
Benstead was capped by England youth and won three caps for England Semi-Pro in 1994.

Coaching career 
Benstead has worked as a goalkeeping coach at Brentford, Basingstoke Town, Chertsey Town, Farnborough Town, Stevenage Borough and Frimley Green. He served as caretaker manager of Farnborough Town for one match and in 2004 was assistant to manager Graham Westley at Stevenage Borough.

Personal life 
Benstead works as a self-employed painter and decorator.

Career statistics

Honours 
Sheffield United
 Football League Third Division second-place promotion: 1988–89

Brentford
 Football League Third Division: 1991–92

Rushden & Diamonds
Southern League Premier Division: 1995–96

Individual
 Brentford Supporters' Player of the Year: 1990–91
 Brentford Players' Player of the Year: 1990–91

References 

Canary Citizens by Mark Davage, John Eastwood, Kevin Platt, published by Jarrold Publishing, (2001),

External links 

1963 births
Living people
Queens Park Rangers F.C. players
Norwich City F.C. players
Colchester United F.C. players
Sheffield United F.C. players
Brentford F.C. players
Kettering Town F.C. players
Rushden & Diamonds F.C. players
Basingstoke Town F.C. players
Farnborough F.C. players
Sportspeople from Aldershot
England semi-pro international footballers
Association football goalkeepers
Chertsey Town F.C. players
Stevenage F.C. players
England youth international footballers
Farnborough F.C. managers
Stevenage F.C. non-playing staff
National League (English football) players
Isthmian League players
National League (English football) managers
Southern Football League players
English Football League players
English football managers
Brentford F.C. non-playing staff
English footballers
Footballers from Hampshire